Kenneth Robert Corday (born June 16, 1950) is an American television soap opera producer and music composer. He is the son of Ted Corday and Betty Corday, the co-creators of Days of Our Lives. His production company Corday Productions owns 1% of "The Young and the Restless" while Sony Pictures Television owns the majority of the serial.

Early life
Corday graduated from the University of California, Santa Cruz in 1977 with a master's degree in music composition.

Positions held
1977-78: Production assistant
1979; Assistant producer and music composer
1981: CEO, Corday Productions Inc. (from May 1986 to present: executive producer)
1988: Head writer (during the Writers Guild of America strike)

In 2021, Corday served as executive producer of the Peacock-exclusive "Days of Our Lives" spinoff, "Days of Our Lives: Beyond Salem".

Awards and nominations
Corday has been nominated for 16 Daytime Emmys. Corday won the Daytime Emmy Award for Music Direction and Composition For a Drama Series in 1990 and 1997, and was nominated in the same category in 2006 and 2007. He was nominated for the Daytime Emmy for Outstanding Daytime Drama Series in 1983, 1984, 1985, 1995, 1996, 1997, 1998, 1999, 2009 and 2012. He won the 2007 Film & TV Music Award for Best Score for a Television Daytime Drama for his work on the series. In 2017 he was honored with a star on the Hollywood Walk of Fame.

Personal life
He married Sherry Williams in 1987; the couple has three children.

Executive producing tenure

References

External links
 
 

1950 births
Living people
American chief executives in the media industry
American television producers
American soap opera writers
American male composers
Place of birth missing (living people)
21st-century American composers
Days of Our Lives
Soap opera producers
University of California, Santa Cruz alumni
San Jose State University alumni
American male television writers
21st-century American male musicians
La-La Land Records artists